Hicham Muolaij Miftah (born 3 June 1980 in Morocco) is a Moroccan retired footballer.

Career

Born in Morocco, Miftah moved with his family to Italy at the age of 8.

In 1999/00, Miftah scored 17 goals for A.S. Pizzighettone in the Italian fourth division, which he claimed was the turning point of his career.

During 2003/04, Miftah played for Calcio Catania in the Italian second division, his only time playing above the third division. In 2019, he said that "At the time I was a bit bright with a strong character, I didn't accept certain behaviors but now, years later, I admit I was wrong. In football you have to close your mouth and pedal".

References

External links
 

1980 births
Living people
Footballers from Casablanca
Moroccan footballers
Italian footballers
Moroccan emigrants to Italy
Italian sportspeople of African descent
Naturalised citizens of Italy
Association football forwards
A.C. Reggiana 1919 players
Catania S.S.D. players
Como 1907 players